Boris Živković (born 15 November 1975) is a Croatian former professional footballer who played as a full-back and centre-back.

Živković began his professional career with Marsonia and Hrvatski Dragovoljac in his native country before spending six seasons with Bundesliga club Bayer Leverkusen. Following shorter stints at Portsmouth, VfB Stuttgart, and 1. FC Köln, he returned to Croatia to play for Hajduk Split.

At international level, Živković represented the Croatia national team making 39 appearances, 18 of which as the captain of the team.

Club career

Early career
Živković started his career at Sarajevo as a youth player, before being signed by Marsonia (from Slavonski Brod). He gained a good reputation at Marsonia, first appearing in the 1994–95 season, during which he made 13 appearances. The next season, he played a further 31 games before transferring to Hrvatski Dragovoljac (from Siget, Zagreb). He only spent one season at his new club however, before impressive performances persuaded German club Bayer Leverkusen to sign him.

Bayer Leverkusen
Živković went on to play six seasons for the German club, playing over 150 times, including the 2002 UEFA Champions League Final. Following his contract expiring in the summer of 2003, Živković stated his desire to play in the Premier League, and was signed later that summer by Portsmouth.

Portsmouth and Stuttgart
Živković started his Pompey career well, instantly claiming a regular starting place. However, in December, a public fall-out with manager Harry Redknapp led to him being released, having played only 18 times for the club. VfB Stuttgart stepped in to bring Živković back to Germany, and the Croatian joined them in January.

Hajduk Split
In August 2006 he moved to Hajduk Split.

International career
Živković was a regular for the Croatian national team, making 39 appearances and scoring twice. He was part of the squad at the 2002 FIFA World Cup, but in his first game against Mexico, he caused a penalty in the 59th minute after which he was sent off and the Mexicans went on to score from the penalty mark and win the game by 1-0. He was no longer in the team for the remaining two games Croatia played on the tournament before being eliminated — Italy and Mexico progressed from the group to the playoffs instead.

He also played two games at Euro 2004. Boris was out of favour for the Zlatko Kranjčar's World Cup 2006 campaign but many defender injuries forced Slaven Bilić to give him a call for the Euro 2008 spring qualifying games. His final international was a February 2007 friendly match against Norway.

Career statistics
Scores and results list Croatia's goal tally first, score column indicates score after each Živković goal.

References

External links
 

1975 births
Living people
People from Živinice
Croats of Bosnia and Herzegovina
Association football defenders
Croatian footballers
Croatia international footballers
2002 FIFA World Cup players
UEFA Euro 2004 players
FK Sarajevo players
NK Marsonia players
NK Hrvatski Dragovoljac players
Bayer 04 Leverkusen players
Portsmouth F.C. players
VfB Stuttgart players
1. FC Köln players
HNK Hajduk Split players
Premier League of Bosnia and Herzegovina players
Croatian Football League players
Bundesliga players
Premier League players
Croatian expatriate footballers
Expatriate footballers in Bosnia and Herzegovina
Croatian expatriate sportspeople in Bosnia and Herzegovina
Expatriate footballers in Germany
Croatian expatriate sportspeople in Germany
Expatriate footballers in England
Croatian expatriate sportspeople in England